"Play It Cool, Man" is a song by George Jones. It was released as his second single on May 29, 1954 on Starday Records. It is the oldest recording to be included on his debut album in 1956.

Recording and background
Jones' first recording session wrapped up 5 songs (2 unissued). The third song cut was a rockabilly slide titled "Play It Cool, Man." Like the other songs recorded during the session, the song was greatly influenced by his idols. "No Money in This Deal," "For Sale or For Lease," and "If You Were Mine" displayed a very evident Lefty Frizzell influence. However, Play It Cool, Man displayed a clear Hank Williams influence (Jones' favorite singer). From Jones' bluesy vocal delivery to the steel guitar break, which is reminiscent of Hank's "Honky Tonk Blues," the song's swing and swagger also points unerringly towards rockabilly. Nick Tosches notes in his 1994 Texas Monthly article "The Devil in George Jones", "Though Jones would never acknowledge it, the rockabilly impulse of the early fifties had affected his sound as much as the lingering voices of Acuff and Williams. 'Play It Cool, Man, Play It Cool,' recorded by Jones in 1954, several months before Elvis's debut, had bordered on pure rockabilly..."

The b-side includes one of the two tracks recorded from his first collaboration recorded in April and June of that year in Houston: "Wrong About You" with Sonny Burns."

Personnel
George Jones - vocal, acoustic
Robert Larry "Blackie" Crawford - lead guitar
John "Johnny" Rector - piano
Corlue Bordelon - steel
Buck Crawford - bass
Olen "Big Red" Hays - fiddle
Kenneth "Little Red" Hays - fiddle

1954 songs
George Jones songs
Songs written by George Jones
Starday Records singles